"In This City" is a song by American band Iglu & Hartly. The song is taken from their first album & Then Boom (2008). "In This City" peaked at number thirty-five on the Billboard Alternative Songs chart. Outside of the United States, the song peaked within the top ten of the charts in Belgium (Flanders), the Republic or Ireland, and the United Kingdom. It is so far their only hit, thus making them a one-hit wonder.

Release and reception
The music magazine NME gave the song 8/10 and commented that it has a great chorus and "a joyful pop song". Popjustice made it their 'song of the day', saying "The band specialise in really smart synthy pop tunes with rapping in and when the choruses are this massive it's hard not to become slightly obsessed".

The song was added to the upfront section of the playlist of BBC Radio 1 in the United Kingdom in August 2008 and the A-List the subsequent month.

Chart performance
In the United Kingdom, "In This City" debuted at number 80 on the UK Singles Chart on September 7, 2008 – for the week ending date September 13, 2008 – solely on downloads, and went on to peak at number five on the chart on September 28, 2008 – for the week ending date October 4, 2008 – becoming Iglu & Hartley's first and only top ten song in Britain. In Ireland, the song peaked at number nine on the Irish Singles Chart.

Weekly charts

Year-end charts

Certifications

References

External links
Iglu & Hartly official website
Track listing at Amazon
'In This City' Songfacts

2008 singles
2008 songs
Iglu & Hartly songs
Mercury Records singles